Leonardo Carmini or Leonardo Corbera (died 1502) was a Roman Catholic prelate who served as Bishop of Trivento (1498–1502) and Bishop of Montepeloso (1491–1498).

Biography
On 10 January 1491, Leonardo Carmini was appointed during the papacy of Pope Innocent VIII as Bishop of Montepeloso.
On 21 November 1498, he was appointed during the papacy of Pope Alexander VI as Bishop of Trivento.
He served as Bishop of Trivento until his death in 1502.

While bishop, he was the principal consecrator of Gaspard de Toriglia, Bishop of Santa Giusta (1494).

References

External links and additional sources
 (Chronology of Bishops) 
 (Chronology of Bishops) 
 (for Chronology of Bishops) 
 (for Chronology of Bishops) 

15th-century Italian Roman Catholic bishops
16th-century Italian Roman Catholic bishops
Bishops appointed by Pope Innocent VIII
Bishops appointed by Pope Alexander VI
1502 deaths